To Love is a 1964 Swedish drama film written and directed by Jörn Donner. For her performance Harriet Andersson was awarded Volpi Cup for Best Actress at the 25th Venice International Film Festival.

Plot

Cast 

 Harriet Andersson as Louise
 Zbigniew Cybulski as Fredrik
 Isa Quensel as  Märta
  Thomas Svanfeldt as  Jacob
 Nils Eklund as  Vicar
 Jane Friedmann as  Nora
 Jan Erik Lindqvist as  Speaker

References

External links

1964 films
Swedish drama films
1964 drama films
Films directed by Jörn Donner
1960s Swedish films